The Truth and Reconciliation Commission (TRC) was a court-like restorative justice body assembled in South Africa in 1996 after the end of apartheid. Authorised by Nelson Mandela and chaired by Desmond Tutu, the commission invited witnesses who were identified as victims of gross human rights violations to give statements about their experiences, and selected some for public hearings. Perpetrators of violence could also give testimony and request amnesty from both civil and criminal prosecution.

The Institute for Justice and Reconciliation was established in 2000 as the successor organisation of the TRC.

Creation and mandate
The TRC was set up in terms of the Promotion of National Unity and Reconciliation Act, No. 34 of 1995, and was based in Cape Town. The hearings started in 1996. The mandate of the commission was to bear witness to, record, and in some cases grant amnesty to the perpetrators of crimes relating to human rights violations, as well as offering reparation and rehabilitation to the victims. A register of reconciliation was also established so that ordinary South Africans who wished to express regret for past failures could also express their remorse.

The TRC had a number of high-profile members, including Archbishop Desmond Tutu (chairman), Alex Boraine (deputy chairman), Sisi Khampepe, Wynand Malan, Klaas de Jonge and Emma Mashinini.

Committees
The work of the TRC was accomplished through three committees:
 The Human Rights Violations Committee investigated human rights abuses that occurred between 1960 and 1994.
 The Reparation and Rehabilitation Committee was charged with restoring victims' dignity and formulating proposals to assist with rehabilitation.
 The Amnesty Committee considered applications from individuals who applied for amnesty in accordance with the provisions of the Act.

Process 
Public hearings of the Human Rights Violations Committee and the Amnesty Committee were held at many venues around South Africa, including Cape Town (at the University of the Western Cape), Johannesburg (at the Central Methodist Mission), and Randburg (at the Rhema Bible Church).

The commission was empowered to grant amnesty to those who committed abuses during the apartheid era, as long as the crimes were politically motivated, proportionate, and there was full disclosure by the person seeking amnesty. To avoid victor's justice, no side was exempt from appearing before the commission. The commission heard reports of human rights violations and considered amnesty applications from all sides, from the apartheid state to the liberation forces, including the African National Congress.

Numbers 
The Commission found more than 19,050 people had been victims of gross human rights violations. An additional 2,975 victims were identified through the applications for amnesty.  In reporting these numbers, the Commission voiced its regret that there was very little overlap of victims between those seeking restitution and those seeking amnesty.

A total of 5,392 amnesty applications were refused, granting only 849 out of the 7,111 (which includes the number of additional categories, such as "withdrawn").

Significance and impact
The TRC's emphasis on reconciliation was in sharp contrast to the approach taken by the Nuremberg trials and other de-Nazification measures. South Africa's first coalition government chose to pursue forgiveness over prosecution, and reparation over retaliation. 

Opinions differ about the efficacy of the restorative justice method (as employed by the Truth and Reconciliation Commission) as compared to the retributive justice method, of which the Nuremberg trials are an example. In one survey study, the effectiveness of the TRC Commission was measured on a variety of levels: 
 Its usefulness in terms of confirming what had happened during the apartheid regime ("bringing out the truth") 
 The feelings of reconciliation that could be linked to the Commission
 The positive effects (both domestically and internationally) that the Commission brought about (i.e. in the political and the economic environment of South Africa). 
In the study by Orlando Lentini, the opinions of three ethnic groups were measured in this study: the British Africans, the Afrikaners, and the Xhosa. According to the researchers, all of the participants perceived the TRC to be effective in bringing out the truth, but to varying degrees, depending on the group in question.

The differences in opinions about the effectiveness can be attributed to how each group viewed the proceedings. Some viewed them as not entirely accurate, as many people would lie in order to keep themselves out of trouble while receiving amnesty for their crimes. (The commission would grant amnesty to some with consideration given to the weight of the crimes committed.) Some said that the proceedings only helped to remind them of the horrors that had taken place in the past when they had been working to forget such things. Thus, the TRC's effectiveness in terms of achieving those very things within its title is still debatable.

Media coverage
The hearings were initially set to be heard in camera, but the intervention of 23 non-governmental organisations eventually succeeded in gaining media access to the hearings. On 15 April 1996, the South African National Broadcaster televised the first two hours of the first human rights violation committee hearing live. With funding from the Norwegian government, radio continued to broadcast live throughout. Additional high-profile hearings, such as Winnie Mandela's testimony, were also televised live.

The rest of the hearings were presented on television each Sunday, from April 1996 to June 1998, in hour-long episodes of the Truth Commission Special Report. The programme was presented by progressive Afrikaner journalist Max du Preez, former editor of the Vrye Weekblad. The producers of the programme included Anneliese Burgess, Jann Turner, Benedict Motau, Gael Reagon, Rene Schiebe and Bronwyn Nicholson, a production assistant.

In the arts and popular culture

Film 
Various films have been made about the commission:

Documentary films 
 Confronting the Truth (2006) by Steve York. Produced in association with the United States Institute of Peace.
 Facing the Truth (1999) by Bill Moyers. Two-part PBS series.
 Long Night's Journey into Day (2000) by Frances Reid. Won the Grand Jury Prize for best documentary at the Sundance Film Festival.

Feature films 
 Forgiveness (2004) by Ian Gabriel. A South African feature film, starring South African–born actor Arnold Vosloo as a disgraced ex-cop seeking forgiveness from the family of the activist he killed under the apartheid regime. With Quanita Adams and Zane Meas.
 In My Country (2004). A feature film very loosely based on Country of My Skull, a 1998 autobiographical text by Antjie Krog that dealt with her coverage of the hearings. With Samuel L. Jackson and Juliette Binoche.
 Red Dust (2004). A feature film based on the novel of the same title by South African writer Gillian Slovo. With Hilary Swank, Jamie Bartlett and Chiwetel Ejiofor.
 Zulu Love Letter (2004). A film by Ramadan Suleman, starring Pamela Nomvete.
 The Forgiven (2018). A film by Roland Joffé, starring Forest Whitaker as Desmond Tutu and Eric Bana as Piet Blomfeld.

Theatre 
Several plays have been produced about the TRC:
 Truth in Translation (2006), by Paavo Tom Tammi, in collaboration with American director, Michael Lessac and the company of Colonnades Theatre Lab, South Africa.
 Ubu and the Truth Commission (1997), by Jane Taylor and William Kentridge.
 Nothing but the Truth (2002), by John Kani.
 The Story I Am About to Tell, created in collaboration with the Khulumani support group.
 The Dead Wait, by Paul Herzberg.
 Truth and reconciliation, debbie tucker green (2011)
Strange Courtesies San Jose Stagte Company (March 2021 )

Fiction 
 Taylor, Jane. Ubu and the Truth Commission. Cape Town: University of Cape Town Press, 2007.
 Wicomb, Zoe. 2006. Playing in the Light
 Slovo, Gillian 2000. Red Dust. Virago 
 Flanery, Patrick. Absolution.

Poetry 
 Some of Ingrid de Kok's poetry in Terrestrial Things (2002) deals with the TRC (e.g. "The Archbishop Chairs the First Session", "The Transcriber Speaks", "The Sound Engineer").

Criticisms
A 1998 study by South Africa's Centre for the Study of Violence and Reconciliation & the Khulumani Support Group, which surveyed several hundred victims of human rights abuse during the Apartheid era, found that most felt that the TRC had failed to achieve reconciliation between the black and white communities.  Most believed that justice was a prerequisite for reconciliation rather than an alternative to it, and that the TRC had been weighted in favour of the perpetrators of abuse. As a result of the TRC's shortcomings and the unaddressed injuries of many victims, victims' groups, together with NGOs and lawyers, took various TRC-related matters to South African and US courts in the early 2000s.

Another dilemma facing the TRC was how to do justice to the testimonials of those witnesses for whom translation was necessary.  It was believed that, with the great discrepancy between the emotions of the witnesses and those translating them, much of the impact was lost in interlingual rendition.  A briefly tried solution was to have the translators mimic the witnesses' emotions, but this proved disastrous and was quickly scrapped.

While former president F. W. de Klerk appeared before the commission and reiterated his apology for the suffering caused by apartheid, many black South Africans were angered at amnesty being granted for human rights abuses committed by the apartheid government; local reports at the time noted that his failure to accept that the former NP government's policies had given security forces a "licence to kill" - evidenced to him personally in different ways - drove the chairman Archbishop Desmond Tutu almost to tears.  The BBC described such criticisms as stemming from a "basic misunderstanding" about the TRC's mandate, which was to uncover the truth about past abuse, using amnesty as a mechanism, rather than to punish past crimes. Critics of the TRC dispute this, saying that their position is not a misunderstanding but a rejection of the TRC's mandate.

Among the highest-profile of these objections were the criticisms levelled by the family of prominent anti-apartheid activist Steve Biko, who was killed by the security police, and whose story was featured in the film Cry Freedom. Biko's family described the TRC as a "vehicle for political expediency", which "robbed" them of their right to justice. The family opposed amnesty for his killers on these grounds and brought a legal action in South Africa's highest court, arguing that the TRC was unconstitutional.

On the other side of the spectrum, former apartheid State President P.W. Botha defied a subpoena to appear before the commission, calling it a "circus".  His defiance resulted in a fine and suspended sentence, but these were overturned on appeal. Playwright Jane Taylor, responsible for the acclaimed Ubu and the Truth Commission, found fault with the commission's lopsided influence:

The TRC is unquestionably a monumental process, the consequences of which will take years to unravel.  For all its pervasive weight, however, it infiltrates our culture asymmetrically, unevenly across multiple sectors. Its place in small rural communities, for example, when it establishes itself in a local church hall, and absorbs substantial numbers of the population, is very different from its situation in large urban centres, where its presence is marginalised by other social and economic activities.

See also
 Civil Cooperation Bureau, an apartheid hit squad much discussed in the final TRC report
 Institute for Justice and Reconciliation
 Peace commission
 Reconciliation theology
 Restorative justice
 Transitional justice
 Truth commission

Notes

References

Bibliography

Non-fiction 
 Terry Bell, Dumisa Buhle Ntsebeza. 2003. "Unfinished Business: South Africa, Apartheid and Truth."
 Boraine, Alex. 2001. "A Country Unmasked: Inside South Africa's Truth and Reconciliation Commission."
 Cole, Catherine. 2010. "Performing South Africa's Truth Commission: Stages of Transition."
 Doxtader, Erik and Philippe-Joseph Salazar, Truth and Reconciliation in South Africa. The Fundamental Documents, Cape Town: New Africa Books/David Philip, 2008.
 Edelstein, Jillian. 2002. "Truth and Lies: Stories from the Truth and Reconciliation Commission in South Africa."
 Gobodo-Madikizela, Pumla. 2006. "A Human Being Died That Night: A South African Story of Forgiveness."
 Grunebaum, Heidi Peta. Memorializing the Past: Everyday Life in South Africa After the Truth and Reconciliation Commission. Piscataway, NJ: Transaction Publishers, 2011.
 Hayner, Priscilla. 2010. "Unspeakable Truths: Transitional Justice and the Challenge of Truth Commissions"
 Hendricks, Fred. 2003. "Fault-Lines in South African Democracy: Continuing Crisis of Inequality and Injustice."
 Kentridge, William. "Director's Note". In Ubu and the Truth Commission, by Jane Taylor, viii–xv. Cape Town: University of Cape Town Press, 2007.
 Kesselring, Rita. 2017. Bodies of Truth: Law, memory and emancipation in post-apartheid South Africa. Stanford University Press.
 Krog, Antjie. 2000. "Country of My Skull: Guilt, Sorrow, and the Limits of Forgiveness in the New South Africa."
 Martin, Arnaud. 2009. La mémoire et le pardon. Les commissions de la vérité et de la réconciliation en Amérique latine. Paris: L'Harmattan.
 Moon, Claire. 2008. "Narrating Political Reconciliation: South Africa's Truth and Reconciliation Commission."
 Ross, Fiona. 2002. "Bearing Witness: Women and the Truth and Reconciliation Commission in South Africa."
 Tutu, Desmond. 2000. "No Future Without Forgiveness."
 Villa-Vicencio, Charles and Wilhelm Verwoerd. 2005. "Looking Back, Reaching Forward: Reflections on the Truth and Reconciliation Commission of South Africa."
 Wilson, Richard A. 2001. The Politics of Truth and Reconciliation in South Africa: legitimizing the post-apartheid state. Cambridge University Press.

External links
 Official website
 "Traces of Truth": Documents relating to the Truth and Reconciliation Commission

 
1996 establishments in South Africa
Reconciliation
Organisations associated with apartheid
Events associated with apartheid
Defunct organisations based in South Africa
Political history of South Africa
Public inquiries in South Africa